Acacia barbinervis is a shrub belonging to the genus Acacia and the subgenus Phyllodineae endemic to Western Australia.

Description
The phyllodes have five nerves and a prominently raised midrib. It blooms from November to December and produces cream-yellow flowers. The simple inflorescences occur singly or in pairs in the axils. The spherical flower-heads contain 12 to 22 golden or creamy coloured flowers.

Taxonomy
The species was first formally described by the botanist George Bentham in 1842 as part of William Jackson Hooker's work Notes on Mimoseae, with a synopsis of species as published in the London Journal of Botany. It was reclassified as Racosperma barbinerve in 2003 by Leslie Pedley then transferred back to the genus Acacia in 2006.
The species resembles and is closely related to Acacia costata.
There are two known subspecies:
Acacia barbinervis subsp. borealis described in 1999 by Bruce Maslin.
Acacia barbinervis Benth. subsp. barbinervis.

Distribution
It is native to an area along the west coast in the Wheatbelt and the Peel regions of Western Australia growing in lateritic sandy soils. The range of the shrub extends from Eneabba in the north to around Waroona in the south.

See also
List of Acacia species

References

barbinervis
Acacias of Western Australia
Plants described in 1842
Taxa named by George Bentham